Tracey Ullman's State of the Union is an American sketch comedy series starring Tracey Ullman. The series was written by Ullman along with Hollywood satirist Bruce Wagner. Gail Parent and Craig DiGregorio acted as contributing writers to the series' first season. The show ran for three seasons on Showtime. On May 17, 2010, it was announced that the show would not be returning for a fourth season.

Premise
The show takes a satirical look at a day in the life of America.

Cast
 Tracey Ullman as Various
 Scott Bakula as Chris Fulbright
 Jennifer Fitzgerald as Various
 Jo Ann Harris as Various 
 Lily Holleman as Various
 Johnny McKeown as Various
 Sam McMurray as Various
 Larry Poindexter as Various
 Vonda Shepard as Various
 Dylan Sprayberry as Jesse
 Lynne Marie Stewart as Various
 Peter Strauss as Narrator

Production
After her HBO sketch comedy television series Tracey Takes On... ended in 1999, Ullman was looking to take a break from her multi-character television work. She had plans to develop a new show where she'd play at most three characters. In the meantime, she continued to work in film and on her e-commerce boutique Purple Skirt. The web site would become the basis for the fashion-based talk show Tracey Ullman's Visible Panty Lines for Oxygen in 2001. She returned to HBO in 2003 with the television special Tracey Ullman in the Trailer Tales, which she produced and directed, along with a film version of her one-woman show Tracey Ullman: Live and Exposed in 2005. She later approached the network with an idea for a new sketch comedy series which HBO ultimately wasn't in the market for. She then brought the idea to Showtime. President of Entertainment at Showtime, Robert Goldblatt, recalled Ullman fondly from his days working at Fox. "I have always loved Tracey Ullman ever since I was a young development executive at Fox when she was doing the original 'Tracey Ullman Show,' ... She is a one-of-a-kind comedienne and sketch comedy performer, a true artist. We are so proud to bring her to Showtime in a completely new show that will again showcase what she does best, and in this case, she will be looking at the wide cross-section of Americans and both celebrating us and sending us up."

Format
The show is shot in cutaway fashion, with each sketch lasting only a few seconds to a few minutes, much like a YouTube clip, a style Ullman was looking to achieve. Each episode takes place within a 24-hour period and is narrated throughout by actor Peter Strauss.

Showtime's Robert Greenblatt explained, "No sketch is longer than a minute and a half. Each episode is a day in the life of the United States. You pop in on people all over the country, really quick visits. You'll go to some famous people. You'll see some recognizable faces and some regular Americans. You revisit characters from episode to episode. You'll go in and out, like the Google map of the U.S., in and out from the outer atmosphere. You'll go to Iowa and visit two women on a farm and then you'll pull out and go to Los Angeles and see Arianna Huffington, played by Ullman, in her boudoir, and then pull out and go to Washington, D.C. and see a woman who's an anchor for the evening news. Ullman will play 90 percent of the characters, men and women."

Adaptations
On November 6, 2008, it was announced that State of the Union would be remade for Germany starring comedian, writer, Mona Sharma, under the title Lage Der Nation.

Characters

Original

Celebrity impersonations
The following is a complete list of celebrities impersonated in the show.

 Christiane Amanpour
 David Beckham
 Victoria Beckham
 Susan Boyle
 Tom Brokaw
 Campbell Brown
 Carla Bruni
 Laura Bush
 Rita Cosby
 Penélope Cruz
 Laurie David
 Judi Dench
 Cameron Diaz
 Celine Dion
 Jodie Foster
 Barney Frank
 Ruth Bader Ginsburg
 Len Goodman
 Jonah Hill
 Arianna Huffington
 Donna Karan
 Caroline Kennedy
 Dina Lohan
 Rachel Maddow
 Ruth Madoff
 Meghan McCain
 Matthew McConaughey
 Heather Mills
 Helen Mirren
 Nancy Pelosi
 Miuccia Prada
 Seth Rogen
 Andy Rooney
 Debbie Rowe
 JK Rowling
 Tony Sirico
 Suzanne Somers
 Sonia Sotomayor
 Candy Spelling
 Angela Suleman
 Kate Winslet
 Renée Zellweger

Episodes

Home media

Region 0

Region 2

Region 4

Reception

Critical response
The series received overwhelmingly positive reviews, with many critics dissecting elements of the show, including the length of the sketches, the show's format, and its celebrity mock-ups. Suggesting that Ullman's stronger portrayals are found in her original characters, rather than the famous, one reviewer wrote, "Ullman's satire is at its best when she inhabits the little people."  Others praised its collection of famous, and semi-famous impersonations, including Arianna Huffington, "who sleeps with her laptop and has a dramatic Eva Gabor accent and penchant for using "blog" in every part of her speech." "Her best moments came as Arianna, Dina [Lohan] and Laurie [David]", stated April MacIntyre, of Monsters & Critics.

Its YouTube-format garnered a few complaints. "...She can do so much, initially she's doing too much. Though fun, the opener's skits are too short, and the characters too numerous, for any one joke to register.  But give the show a week to settle, and the strengths of Ullman's concept come to the fore. As the show grows clearer and funnier, you may even find yourself anticipating the return of favorite characters..."

Commenting on the writing, a critic noted, "Ullman is obviously great at impressions, but it's the sharpness of the writing that sets this show apart from other sketch comedies. Ullman tosses off so many excellent one-liners along the way, it's hard to keep track of them all."

"It may take "Saturday Night Live" a season to put out this many funny characters and celebrity portrayals. But the glossy "State of the Union", narrated by Peter Strauss, churns out a dozen or more in each week's half-hour."

Ratings
The show's premiere episode raked in 907,000 viewers for its first night of three airings, 776,000 combined for 10PM and 10:30PM, (just short of Showtime series Californication'''s debut total of 795,000).  Pre-airings of State of the Union were available through cable television's On Demand service weeks before its official premiere on the network.

Celebrity reaction
Celebrity impersonations have become a recent addition to Ullman's comedic repertoire, something that she had not dabbled in since her early days at the BBC, nearly thirty years prior.  The slightly famous to the infamous are skewered in State of the Union.  Reaction to the parodies were fast in coming from the actual celebrities themselves.

One of the first reactions came from actress Renée Zellweger.  In a sketch, Zellweger is featured on a press junket for her new movie, where her character has a condition called "chronic narcissistic squint".  The real Zellweger was shown a picture of Ullman doing an impersonation of her on the Late Show with David Letterman.  Ullman revealed that she wore no make-up to get her Zellweger appearance.  She simply donned long eyelashes, very much like Shari Lewis' Lambchop. "This is why I need therapy… I better watch what I say. Look at what happens when I've done nothing to her."  She went on to say that Ullman looked like her "transvestite twin brother".

Political pundit Arianna Huffington's thick Greek accent and obsession with blogging receive numerous jabs throughout the series.  The word "blog" is often substituted for various nouns and verbs.  While filling out an Internet dating profile, Ullman as Huffington types, "Must enjoy nice long blogs in the rain."  She clutches her laptop in her arms and kisses it goodnight upon going to sleep.  Huffington takes the parody in good humor, saying, "I actually loved it."  Huffington continued, "She does a really good imitation of me... And you know....she ends a lot of her imitations of me by saying 'blogs and kisses,' which is kind of something pretty good. I like that.
Huffington's parody is generally lighthearted.  The same wouldn't be said for the show's take on the American news media and its "fear mongering".  Real-life CNN news anchor Campbell Brown serves as the vessel in which this is made apparent.  In one episode, "Horror, terror, horror, terror, nightmare, horror, fear.  Back to you, Brian", serves as the entire report issued by Brown.  Campbell issued a statement regarding the parody saying that she "loves, loves Tracey Ullman, and is a huge fan of the show." Brown went on to say that she wanted to book Ullman on her 8 p.m. program.

Larry David, ex-husband of Laurie David (who's impersonated in the show), publicly confronted Ullman yelling that he didn't appreciate what she did to his wife and how she was upset. Ullman says it turned into an episode of Curb Your Enthusiasm''. She later apologized personally to Laurie David.

In the end, Ullman contends that celebrities "love being impersonated".

Awards and nominations

References

External links
 
 

2000s American satirical television series
2000s American sketch comedy television series
2008 American television series debuts
2010s American satirical television series
2010s American sketch comedy television series
2010 American television series endings
Showtime (TV network) original programming
Australian Broadcasting Corporation original programming
Tracey Ullman
English-language television shows